The 2017 Royal London One-Day Cup tournament was a limited overs cricket competition that forms part of the 2017 domestic cricket season in England and Wales. Matches were contested over 50 overs per side and had List A cricket status. All eighteen First-class counties competed in the tournament which ran from the end of April with the final taking place at Lord's on 1 July. Nottinghamshire won the tournament, defeating Surrey in the final. The defending champions were Warwickshire.

The 2017 competition was moved earlier in the season with a reduced knockout stage in order to allow the 2017 NatWest t20 Blast to take place during the school summer holidays and England players to prepare for the 2017 ICC Champions Trophy taking place in England and Wales during June. It followed a similar schedule to the Benson & Hedges Cup competition which was played early in the season and ran from the 1970s until 2002.

The scheduling of the competition earlier during the domestic season was also designed to allow limited overs cricket to be played in two blocks - one for the One Day Cup and one for the T20 Blast. The aim of the England and Wales Cricket Board was to enable county players to develop white-ball skills more effectively, to allow preparation for England matches and to make the cricket schedule easier to understand.

Format 
The competition featured two groups of nine teams based on a North–South geographical split. Each team played eight matches during the group stage, playing every other member of their group once. Four matches were played at home venues by each county. The group stage took place from the end of April to the middle of May with the group winners progressing straight to the semi-finals with the second and third placed teams in each group playing a quarter-final against a team from the other group with the winner progressing to one of the semi-final matches.

The competition was paused for the majority of the 2017 ICC Champions Trophy which took place in England and Wales during June, with the quarter-finals and semi-finals taking place between 13 and 17 June. The knock-out stages of the competition resumed towards the end of the Champions Trophy with the final taking place at Lord's on 1 July.

As part of their punishment for accepting a £3.8 million financial aid package from the ECB during the 2016 season, Durham began the 2017 competition with a deduction of two points.

Group stage
The group stage took place from the end of April to the middle of May with each team playing eight matches. The top three teams in each group qualified for the play off stage of the competition.

North Group
The North Group was won by Worcestershire who won six of their matches and tied one. Yorkshire and Nottinghamshire finished second and third in the group respectively and qualified for the quarter-final stage.

Table

Fixtures

South Group
The South group was won by Essex who won seven of their matches. Somerset and Surrey finished second and third in the group respectively and qualified for the quarter-final stage of the tournament.

Table

Fixtures

Knockout stage
The winner of each group progressed straight to the semi-finals with the second and third placed teams playing a play-off match against a team from the other group which made up the quarter-finals. The winner of each quarter-final played one of the group winners in the semi-finals. The final was held at Lord's on 1 July 2017.

Quarter-finals

Semi-finals

Final

References

External links
 

2017 in English cricket
Royal London One-Day Cup
Royal London One-Day Cup